Robert Newton Hall,  (July 26, 1836 – July 1, 1907) was a lawyer, educator, judge and political figure in Quebec, Canada. He represented Town of Sherbrooke in the House of Commons of Canada from 1882 to 1891 as a Liberal-Conservative member.

He was born in Laprairie, Lower Canada, the son of the Reverend R.V. Hall, and received a B.A. from the University of Vermont in Burlington, Vermont. He was called to the Lower Canada bar in 1861 and set up practice in Sherbrooke. Hall married Lena Kendrick in 1862. He received a LL.D. from Bishop's College in 1880. In the same year, he was named Queen's Counsel. Hall was batonnier for the St. Francis section of the Quebec bar from 1877 to 1881 and was batonnier for the province in 1878. Hall served as chair of the Select Committee on Geological Surveys in 1884. He was dean of the Faculty of Law at Bishop's College. In 1873, he was named a government director for the Canadian Pacific Railway. He was president for the Massawippi Railway and for the Sherbrooke Gas and Water Company and a director of the Quebec Central Railway.

In 1892, he was named judge in the Court of Queen's Bench; he retired from the bench due to illness in March 1907. He died later that year at the age of 70 while travelling to England.

Family

He married Lena, eldest daughter of A. W. Kendrick, of Compton, P.Q. The couple had three daughters Katharine Hall, Adele Hall and Mrs. Ingleby, who were born and educated in Canada. The daughters were known as "The Rideau Halls" since they occupied a prominent place in Canadian society since 1887,

References 
 
The Canadian parliamentary companion, 1885 JA Gemmill

1836 births
1907 deaths
Members of the House of Commons of Canada from Quebec
Conservative Party of Canada (1867–1942) MPs
Judges in Quebec
People from La Prairie, Quebec
Anglophone Quebec people
Canadian King's Counsel
University of Vermont alumni